This list of Argentine cities by population briefly explains the three different population figures given for Argentine cities, and provides rankings for each. The population of each city except Buenos Aires includes its conurbation. Greater Buenos Aires has a population of 12,801,365. There is also a list at the bottom of this page that shows the GDP (PPP: Purchasing Power Parity) of each greater metropolitan area of the largest cities in the country.

Cities by population 
Provincial Capitals are in bold.

The listed cities below according to the 2010 & 2001 census by INDEC: National Institute of Statistics and Census of Argentina, as well as 2010 totals by World Book Encyclopedia. The list is in order by 2010 numbers, unless there is no 2010 data, then 2001 numbers were used to substitute.

Metropolitan areas of Argentina by GDP (PPP)

2010 Census Data

See also
 List of cities

References